Tatyana Valeryevna Dektyareva (born 8 May 1981 in Yekaterinburg) is a Russian track and field athlete who specialises in the 100 metres hurdles.

Doping ban 
Dektyareva tested positive for the selective androgen receptor modulator Ostarine in an out-of-competition test 9 December 2014, and was subsequently handed a two-year ban from sport.

International competitions

See also
List of doping cases in athletics
List of people from Yekaterinburg

References

External links 
 

1981 births
Living people
Sportspeople from Yekaterinburg
Russian female hurdlers
Olympic female hurdlers
Olympic athletes of Russia
Athletes (track and field) at the 2008 Summer Olympics
Athletes (track and field) at the 2012 Summer Olympics
World Athletics Championships athletes for Russia
Russian Athletics Championships winners
Doping cases in athletics
Russian sportspeople in doping cases